Pelobacter venetianus is a species of bacteria that degrade polyethylene glycol. It is strictly anaerobic, Gram-negative, and nonspore-forming.

References

Further reading

External links

LPSN
WORMS entry
Type strain of Pelobacter venetianus at BacDive -  the Bacterial Diversity Metadatabase

Pelobacteraceae
Bacteria described in 1983